Valdian (also Romanized as Valdīān, Valadiyan, Valdeyān, and Valdīyān) is a village in Valdian Rural District of Ivughli District of Khoy County, West Azerbaijan province, Iran. At the 2006 National Census, its population was 1,668 in 376 households. The following census in 2011 counted 1,622 people in 474 households. The latest census in 2016 showed a population of 1,572 people in 500 households; it was the largest village in its rural district.

References 

Khoy County

Populated places in West Azerbaijan Province

Populated places in Khoy County